Mohcine Malzi (also Mouhcine Malzi) is a Moroccan actor.

Career
Mohcine Malzi is known for his starring role of "Abdelkader" in Faouzi Bensaïdi's 2017 feature film, the romantic drama, Volubilis, also featuring Nadia Kounda and Nezha Rahil, and for which he won the "Best Actor" award at the 2018 Tangier National Film Festival (TNFF). In 2019, he starred in Saidi Bensaïdi's comedy-drama film, Taxi Bied, alongside Mohamed El Khyari, Sahar Seddiki, Anas El Baz, Hassan Foulane and Saida Baâdi  and in 2020  starred in the Moroccan television movie, L'balisa, also featuring Ahmed Yreziz and Jalila Tlamsi. He teamed up again with Moroccan director Faouzi Bensaïdi for the feature film Summer Days scheduled to have its world premiere at the 2022 Marrakech Film Festival.

Filmography

Film

Television

Accolades

References

External links
 Mouhcine Malzi on IMDb
 Mohcine Malzi on SPLA
 Mohcine Malzi on Africine
 Mouhcine Malzi on Bios Agenda
 https://www.plurielle.ma/people/mouhcine-malzi-le-beau-gosse-du-petit-ecran-marocain/

Living people
Moroccan actors
1982 births